Deneen Laverne Borelli (born May 28, 1964) is an American conservative author, radio and television personality, and columnist. She is the author of Blacklash: How Obama and the Left are Driving Americans to the Government Plantation, a political critique of what she describes as progressivism, crony capitalism, and elitism under the Obama administration.

Borelli is a contributor on Fox News and Fox Business and has appeared on programs such as Hannity, Fox & Friends, Your World with Neil Cavuto, America's Newsroom, Making Money with Charles Payne, Trish Regan Primetime, and Lou Dobbs Tonight.

Borelli is a guest host with SiriusXM Patriot satellite radio and fills in for national broadcast radio shows including The Sean Hannity Show, The David Webb Show, and The Wilkow Majority.

Borelli was a host on BlazeTV; has spoken at Tea Party rallies; was the Outreach Director for Tea Party group FreedomWorks overseeing its Empower.org outreach program; and a Manager of Media Relations with the Congress of Racial Equality (CORE). Borelli was also a Senior Fellow with Project 21, a network of black conservatives organized by the National Center for Public Policy Research.

See also
 Black conservatism in the United States

References

External links
 
 

Living people
1964 births
21st-century American journalists
21st-century American women writers
American columnists
American political commentators
American political writers
American women columnists
Connecticut Republicans
Fox News people
Journalists from New York (state)
New York (state) Republicans
Pace University alumni
People from Greenwich, Connecticut
Tea Party movement activists
Blaze Media people
Black conservatism in the United States